The Bergamini class was a class of four frigates operated by the Italian Navy. They entered service in 1961, with the last one being stricken in 1988.

Design
A new class of four corvettes officially designated Corvette Veloci Tipo 2 - (Type 2 Fast Corvette) for the Marina Militare (Italian Navy) was announced in 1956.

The armament of the class was subject to numerous changes during the design and construction process, which affected the layout of the ship. As finally built, the ships carried an anti-aircraft armament of three  rapid fire cannons, capable of firing 57 rounds per minute per gun, with two forward and one aft. This was supplemented by two Mark 32 triple torpedo tubes capable of launching American lightweight Mark 44 torpedoes. A helicopter deck and folding hangar for a light helicopter was fitted behind the bridge, with the diesel exhaust uptakes and the ship's mast combined into a mack to make room for the hangar, while fin stabilisers were fitted to aid helicopter operations on such a small ship.

History
Carlo Margottini and Luigi Rizzo were laid down at the Navalmeccanica shipyard, Castellammare in 1957.  The next ship of the class, Carlo Bergamini was planned to be built by Cantieri Navale de Taranto, but the order was switched to the CRDA shipyards at Trieste, work starting in 1959. The final ship of the class, Virginio Fasan was laid down at Castellammare in 1960. Luigi Rizzo was the first to enter service in 1961, with all four ships in service by the end of 1962.

In the late 1960s, the Marina Militare adopted the AB.204 as its standard shipboard helicopter. In order to accommodate the larger helicopter, a larger helicopter deck and hangar (which was still collapsible) was fitted, which in turn required removal of the aft 76 mm gun.

Luigi Rizzo and Carlo Bergamini were discarded in 1980 and 1981 respectively. The final two ships were not finally stricken until 1988.

Ships in class
Source

Citations

References
 Blackman, Raymond V. B. Jane's Fighting Ships 1962–63. London: Sampson Low, Marston & Company, 1962.
 Blackman, Raymond V. B. Jane's Fighting Ships 1971–72. London: Sampson Low, Marston & Company, 1971. .
 Gardiner, Robert and Stephen Chumbley. Conway's All The World's Fighting Ships 1947–1995. Annapolis, Maryland USA: Naval Institute Press, 1995. .

External links
 Carlo Bergamini (F 593) Marina Militare website

 
Frigate classes